The Original High is the third studio album by American singer Adam Lambert, released on June 12, 2015, by Warner Bros. Records. Its executive producers are Max Martin and Shellback, the duo responsible for co-writing and producing Lambert's early-career hits "Whataya Want from Me" and "If I Had You". The album marks Lambert's first release since leaving previous record label, RCA Records. The record's style has been described as EDM, pop-house, synth-pop, and electropop.

The album was preceded by the release of its lead single, "Ghost Town", on April 21, 2015. "Another Lonely Night" was released as the album's second single on October 9, 2015.

The Original High peaked within the top 10 of 11 national album charts. It debuted at number 3 on the Billboard 200 chart selling 42,000 copies in its opening week. It also became Lambert's first ever UK top 10 album, debuting and peaking at number 8.

Background
In July 2013, it was reported that Lambert had left his record label of five years, RCA Records, due to "creative differences"; the label was allegedly pushing him to record an album composed of cover songs from the 1980s. The day after his announcement, Lambert was contacted by Warner Bros. Records. A deal with the label was confirmed by Billboard in January 2015, along with news that his upcoming album would be executively produced by Max Martin and Shellback and was scheduled for release in the summer of 2015. Songwriting for the album began in early 2014, with recording taking place between 2014 and 2015 in the producers' native Sweden.

Lambert first revealed the album title on social media on January 29, 2015, also his birthday. In March 2015, he unveiled additional details regarding the musical direction of the album in an interview with Hunger TV magazine. Describing the style of the album as less "campy" and theatrical than his previous material, Lambert also identified the album's genre as "definitely pop but not bubblegum."

Critical reception 

The Original High received positive reviews from music critics. On Metacritic, which assigns a normalized rating out of 100 to reviews from mainstream critics, the album received an average score of 70 based on six reviews, indicating "generally favorable reviews". Stephen Thomas Erlewine from AllMusic gave the album four out of five stars, commenting that "Adam Lambert demonstrates he's in perfect control of his style and sound and knows how to combine both into a sterling modern pop record." Jon Caramanica, music critic of The New York Times was also positive on the album, found the star focused and committed to his style and in the end noted: "While there are a few missteps--Mr. Lambert doesn’t have the R&B sultriness required for “Underground,” and “Rumors” bizarrely cribs the jaunty synth pattern from Lil Wayne’s “Lollipop”--there are almost no extravagances. After years of spectacle, Mr. Lambert may have been saved by modesty."

Lauren Murphy from The Irish Times gave only two stars out of five, commented "this unfortunately titled record is neither original nor uplifting enough to generate a high of any description." Brittany Spanos from the Rolling Stone magazine gave the album three out of five stars, stating that "even when the lyrics verge on ridiculousness [...], he's one of the biggest personalities in pop."  Maura Johnson from The Boston Globe wrote that the album is "an appealing snapshot of how Lambert has grown, and how he’s still willing to surprise his listeners and himself." Joey Guerra of the Houston Chronicle was similarly impressed, writing that the album "builds on the brash appeal that made [Lambert] a star."  Pip Ellwood of Entertainment Focus called The Original High "the strongest record that Lambert has released to date."

Commercial performance
In the US market, music industry forecasters predicted that the album could enter the top 10 of the US Billboard 200 chart dated 4 July, with about 35,000 units in its first week. It debuted on the Billboard 200 at number three, selling 42,000 copies in its first week, but totalling 47,000 units including streams and tracks.

On the UK Albums Chart, The Original High debuted at number eight, selling 9,817 copies in its first week, giving Lambert his first-ever UK top ten debut. The album also achieved Lambert's highest-ever album position in the Netherlands, debuting at number ten.

Track listing

Notes
 signifies a vocal producer
 signifies an additional producer
 signifies a remixer

Personnel 
Credits adapted from the liner notes of the deluxe version.

Adam Lambert – vocals (all tracks)
Shellback – keyboards (2, 6, 7), programming (2, 6, 7), guitar (2, 7), bass (7), backing vocals (2, 6, 7), production (2, 6, 7) exec. production (all tracks)
Mattman & Robin – keyboards (2), programming (2), guitar (2), bass (2), percussion (2), production (2)
Ali Payami – programming (1, 3, 4, 5, 7, 8, 13), bass (1, 3, 4, 5, 8), keyboards (1, 3, 4, 5, 7, 8), percussion (1, 3, 4, 5, 8, 13), production (1, 3, 4, 5, 7, 8) additional production (13)
Tobias Karlsson – guitars (1, 13, 14), keyboards (13, 14), bass (13, 14), programming (13, 14), production (13, 14), engineering (13, 14), vocal recording
Tove Lo – vocals (6)
Oscar Holter – keyboards (7, 9), bass (9), guitar (9), programming (7, 9), backing vocals (9), production (7, 9), vocal production (9)
Ilya – programming (9), bass (9), keys (9), guitars (9), backing vocals (9), production (9), vocal production (4, 9)
Thrice Noble – programming (13), additional keys and guitar (13)
Savan Kotecha – backing vocals (9)
Lulou – guitars, keyboards, bass, programming, percussion (10), production (10)
Svideen – keyboards, bass, programming, percussion (11), production (11)
Jarly – keyboards, bass, programming, percussion (11), production (11), vocal editing (11)
Style of Eye – keyboards, bass, programming, percussion (11), production (11)
Andreas Schuller – percussion, synth (12)
John West – guitar (12)
Brian May – guitar (8)
OzGo – keyboards (6), guitar (6), programming (6), production (6)
Axident – guitar, percussion (2), production (12), engineering (12)
Max Martin – backing vocals (4), production (1, 3, 8) exec. production (all tracks)
Sterling Fox – backing vocals (1, 3)
Fredrik Samsson – production (8)
Cory Bice – engineering (1, 9), assistant engineering (3, 5, 8)
Michael Ilbert – additional engineering (1)
Peter Carlsson – engineering (9), vocal production (5, 8, 10, 11), vocal recording (2), vocal editing (3, 7)
Spyke Lee – assistant engineering (2, 6, 7)
Sam Holland – engineering (3, 5, 8, 10)
Jeremy Lertola – assistant engineering (3)
Eric Weaver – engineering (13, 14)
Serban Ghenea – mixing (1–9)
John Hanes – assistant mix engineering (1–9)
Michael Ilbert – mixing (10–14)
Tim Roberts – assistant mix engineering (2, 6, 7)
Nanni Johansson – assistant mix engineering (10–14)
Tom Coyne – mastering (all tracks)
Randy Merrill – assistant mastering engineering (all tracks)

Charts

Weekly charts

Year-end charts

Certifications

Release history

References

External links
 Adam Lambert Official Website

2015 albums
Adam Lambert albums
Albums produced by Max Martin
Albums produced by Shellback (record producer)
Albums produced by Ilya Salmanzadeh
Albums produced by Mattman & Robin
Warner Records albums